Brian Mac Cathmhaoi was a priest in Ireland during the mid  14th century.

The Archdeacon of Clogher, in 1356 he became Bishop of Clogher. He died of the plague in 1361

References

14th-century Roman Catholic bishops in Ireland
Pre-Reformation bishops of Clogher
Archdeacons of Clogher
1361 deaths
14th-century deaths from plague (disease)